Events from the year 1181 in Ireland.

Incumbent
Lord: John

Events
Walter de Riddlesford built a motte and bailey fortress on the site of what is now Kilkea Castle in County Kildare.
John, King of England granted Lambay Island to the Archbishops of Dublin.
Hugh de Lacy, Lord of Meath was recalled from his government for having married the daughter of Ruadri O Conchobair, King of Connaught and deposed High King of Ireland, without leave of Henry II of England.

Deaths
Tadhg Ua Dálaigh, poet.

References